Menesia nigriceps is a species of beetle in the family Cerambycidae. It was described by Per Olof Christopher Aurivillius in 1903. It contains the varietas Menesia nigriceps var. inhumeralis.

References

Menesia
Beetles described in 1903